Lara Nabhan (born 17 July 1989) is a Lebanese journalist, who works for Al Arabiya channel.

Born in Zahlé, Lebanon, on July 17, 1989, into a Muslim family belonging to the Shiite sect in Lebanon. She was educated at Antonine University.

Since 2012, she has been working on the Al Arabiya channel, from Dubai in the United Arab Emirates, where she also lives.

References 

Living people
1989 births
Al Arabiya people
Lebanese journalists
Lebanese television presenters
Lebanese women journalists
Lebanese women television presenters